Mulliners Limited of Birmingham was a British coachbuilding business in Bordesley Green, with factories in Bordesley Green and Cherrywood Roads. It made standard bodies for specialist car manufacturers. In the 19th century there were family ties with founders Mulliners of Northampton and the businesses of other Mulliner brothers and cousins but it became a quite separate business belonging to Herbert Mulliner.

A Northampton coach building family founded this business in Leamington Spa for the prosperous custom attracted to the newly fashionable spa town early in the 19th century. Direct ownership and control by Mulliner family interests was lost in 1903 when it was sold to Charles Cammell, which then merged into Cammell Laird. H H Mulliner ceased to be a main-board director of Cammell Laird in 1909. Mulliners Limited continued under various ownerships until the end of 1960, when Standard-Triumph International closed it down.

Herbert Hall Mulliner

Henry Mulliner (1827-1887) of Leamington Spa, second son of Francis Mulliner (1789-1841) of Leamington Spa and Northampton, had six sons and six daughters. Henry published his book Carriage Builder's Tour in America in Leamington in 1883. Henry's Leamington Spa coach building business in Bedford Street and The Parade later had its carriage works in Packington Square and showroom in Chapel Street. Henry's second son Arthur Felton Mulliner (1859-1946) on Henry's death took over the family's Northampton business.

Henry's third son, Herbert Hall Mulliner (1861-1924), in the light of the decline in quality of the Spa's visitors moved in 1885 to Birmingham. Following his father's death in November 1887 and consequent rearrangement of family ownership he made his home in Rugby and took up other interests including in 1895 the manufacture of scientific instruments. In 1897 he converted the coach and carriage making part of his business to motor vehicle bodies and was then employing 200. Used as well as new carriages were sold from the Mulliner showrooms in Broad Street, Birmingham, and H H Mulliner was the first to offer insurance of his carriages against accidents.

Meanwhile continuing with scientific instruments he began producing in Birmingham with F. Wigley, tools for making the more complicated parts of ordnance and they formed companies: Mulliner Wigley Company Limited formed 1895 and Wigley-Mulliner Engineering Company Limited formed 1897. In April 1899 he married. The demands of the South African War led to major developments and the scene of operation was moved to Coventry to a site of some sixty acres. All the companies were amalgamated with Charles Cammell & Co Limited. In 1903 these companies merged into the newly blended armaments and shipbuilding business, Cammell Laird, of Birkenhead and H H Mulliner joined their main board. The ordnance operation became Coventry Ordnance Works and was separated out and jointly owned by Cammell Laird, Fairfield Shipbuilding and Engineering Company of Glasgow and John Brown & Company of Clydebank with Mulliner as managing director, Wigley was responsible for the technical side.

A special article detailed the background of the origins of H H Mulliner's involvement in the ordnance works in a supplement to The Times 9 June 1909. The main workshop at the Coventry Ordnance works was claimed by The Times in 1909 to cover a greater area under its single (110 feet to the apex) roof than any other factory in the country. The travelling cranes were of 110 tons capacity. It was also notable for the arrangement that machines were brought to the work instead of the work to the machines and several machines could work on the same piece at the same time. The cost of the oil alone to fill the well to harden the largest guns approached  £5,000.

In 1908-1909 there was a very public "Mulliner scandal" because H H Mulliner was shown to have embellished reports of German rearmament in the hope of improving their order book for large naval guns. He was asked to tender his resignation from Cammell Laird's board and it was accepted. However he received a settlement of £100,000 which was in addition to the payment of £142,566 for the shares on the merger of the businesses in 1903.

Among H H Mulliner's benefactions were gifts to the Victoria and Albert Museum in 1913 and the purchase in 1920 and "complete modernisation at considerable expense" of Rainham Hall built 1729 in the London Borough of Havering as a setting for part of his outstanding collections of English furniture and English pottery.

Cammell Laird
H H Mulliner's carriage building business, now part of Cammell Laird, built a few bodies for Daimler before it was decided the future lay in making relatively large production runs for motor companies that did not have their own facilities.

Calthorpe
An early contract was gained from Calthorpe, then a booming company, leading to probably the entire output going to them and eventual close financial and corporate links between the two. Mulliners was taken over by Calthorpe Motor Company in 1917.

Mulliners Limited
After Calthorpe failed in 1924, the managing director of Mulliners, Louis Antweiler, who was also on the Calthorpe managing board, arranged to buy the coachbuilding company which he renamed Mulliners Limited.  He obtained contracts with Clyno and Austin for whom he made many Weymann style fabric bodies for the Austin 7. When the fashion for fabric bodies declined, the business with Austin went but was replaced by orders from Hillman, Humber, Standard and Lanchester.

Listed company
In 1929, the company went public. The main business was now with Daimler and Lanchester, making the bodies for the cheaper range of cars with, confusingly, Arthur Mulliner of Northampton making the up-market models. Alvis was added to the list of customers.

During World War II they made bodies for military vehicles and troop carrying gliders.

Bus and coach body building
Military contracts for aircraft and vehicles were given to the company with the advent of World War II. These included the supply of single-deck austerity bus bodies for Bedford OWB chassis. Duple Coachbuilders designed and built a few bus bodies after the war, but were up to capacity in building their Duple Vista coach body, so they sub-contracted their bus body building to Mulliner in 1947, built on the OWB successor, the OB chassis. Vauxhall dealers also ordered bodies direct to Mulliners and the body was built until 1950, of which many were exported, some to oil companies in the Middle East and South America. In the 1950s they secured large contracts for utilitarian bus bodies for the three armed services and government agencies (on the Bedford OB and later Bedford SB and Bedford SBG chassis) and also some for some municipal bus operators, such as Douglas, IOM who, in 1957, had bodies built on Guy Otter chassis, at least one surviving into preservation.

One of its last efforts was an adventurous coach body appearing on a modified Guy Warrior chassis , registered 647BKL, displayed at the 1958 Commercial Motor Show and now preserved. Later that year, when Standard-Triumph purchased the company, it sold the bus-building division to Marshall’s of Cambridge.

Standard-Triumph
After the war, body-building for cars resumed with Aston Martin, Armstrong Siddeley and Triumph joining the list of customers. Standard-Triumph had, by then, a shortage of body-building capacity and this led them to buy the company in 1958, by which time Mulliners were building 700 car bodies each week.

Closure
On 7 December 1960, a shock announcement by Standard-Triumph International, which was about to be sold to prosperous trucks and buses manufacturer Leyland Motors Limited, revealed that the factory would close. "Mulliners Limited, one of the oldest body firms in the motor trade, employs about 800 workers having recently laid off some 750 as redundant because of a shortage of orders". Their products would "continue to be made by other Midlands factories within the S-TI group".

See also
 Arthur Mulliner of Northampton
 Mulliner (London) Limited
 H. J. Mulliner & Co. of Chiswick (later Mulliner Park Ward)

Notes

References

External links

Coachbuilders of the United Kingdom
Defunct companies based in Birmingham, West Midlands